Ivan and Marya is a 1974 Soviet comedy film directed by Boris Rytsarev.

Plot 
The film takes place on the Black Sea in a pioneer camp. Suddenly the pioneer horn disappears and all the pioneers go in search of it, during which they quarrel, make peace and experience various adventures.

Cast 
 Ivan Bortnik as Ivan
 Tatyana Livanova as Marya (as Tatyana Piskunova)
 Ivan Ryzhov as Tsar
 Liya Akhedzhakova as Princess Agrafina
 Yelizaveta Uvarova
 Nikolay Burlyaev
 Valentin Nikulin as Ghost Timosha
 Lev Kruglyy
 Viktor Sergachyov
 Mikhail Kozakov

References

External links 
 

1974 films
1970s Russian-language films
Soviet comedy films
1974 comedy films